Ján Bátik (born 17 January 1986 in Liptovský Mikuláš) is a retired Slovak slalom canoeist who competed at the international level from 2002 to 2018. He competed in the C1 event until 2005. He raced in the C2 event together with Tomáš Kučera from 2006 until 2018, when the discipline was discontinued. He also competed in the mixed C2 event alongside Soňa Stanovská in 2017 and 2018.

Bátik won five medals in the C2 team event at the ICF Canoe Slalom World Championships with a gold (2009), three silvers (2011, 2013, 2014) and a bronze (2007). He also won 4 golds and 2 bronzes at the European Championships.

World Cup individual podiums

References

12 September 2009 final results for the men's C2 team slalom event for the 2009 ICF Canoe Slalom World Championships. – accessed 12 September 2009.

External links

1986 births
Living people
Slovak male canoeists
Medalists at the ICF Canoe Slalom World Championships
Sportspeople from Liptovský Mikuláš